James Lionel Broome Salmon (born 16 October 1959) is an English rugby union centre who uniquely appeared in international matches for both New Zealand and England.

Career
He became a Wellington player in 1980 and first appeared for New Zealand at under-23 level before being selected for a match against Fiji which did not carry full capped status. He was selected for New Zealand's tour to Europe in the autumn of 1981 and won all his three All Black caps on that tour. He made his full New Zealand debut against Romania in Bucharest and played in both tests against France.

Salmon returned to England at the end of the 1983 New Zealand season having made 64 appearances for Wellington. He made his England international debut on 1 June 1985 against his former team, New Zealand, in Christchurch, losing 18–13. His last appearance for England was in the 1987 Rugby World Cup against Wales in Brisbane, losing 16–3. In total he won twelve caps for England in addition to his three for New Zealand.

He played his club rugby with Harlequins, and after retiring had an executive role with them.

Since retiring from rugby, he has worked for Sky Sports and ITV and also has a column in The Daily Telegraph.

References

1959 births
Place of birth missing (living people)
Living people
English rugby union players
Harlequin F.C. players
England international rugby union players
New Zealand international rugby union players
Rugby union centres